The Montrose Micropolitan Statistical Area is a United States Census Bureau defined Micropolitan Statistical Area located in the Montrose area of the State of Colorado.  The Montrose Micropolitan Statistical Area is defined as Montrose County, Colorado.  The Micropolitan Statistical Area had a population of 33,432 at the 2000 Census. A July 1, 2009 U.S. Census Bureau estimate placed the population at 41,412.

The Montrose Micropolitan Statistical Area includes the City of Montrose, the Town of Naturita, the Town of Nucla, the Town of Olathe, and the unincorporated areas of Montrose County.

See also
Montrose County, Colorado
Colorado census statistical areas
Colorado metropolitan areas
Combined Statistical Area
Core Based Statistical Area
Metropolitan Statistical Area
Micropolitan Statistical Area
Table of United States Combined Statistical Areas
Table of United States Metropolitan Statistical Areas
Table of United States Micropolitan Statistical Areas
Table of United States primary census statistical areas
Core Based Statistical Area adjacent to the Montrose Micropolitan Statistical Area:
Grand Junction Metropolitan Statistical Area

References

External links

Micropolitan areas of Colorado